Nongshaba, also spelled as Nongsaba, is a Lion God in Meitei religion (Sanamahism) and mythology. He is also regarded as a king of the gods. He is credited with producing light in the primordial universe and is regarded as the maker of the sun. He is worshipped by the people of both the Ningthouja clans as well as the Moirang clans. God Nongshaba was worshipped by the people of Moirang clan as a lineage deity and regarded as the father of God Thangching (Thangjing).
He is the greatest of the Umang Lais in Ancient Kangleipak (early Manipur) but he made his only son Thangching (Thangjing) the chief deity of Moirang.

History 

The cult of God Nongsaba (Nongshaba) was brought from Moirang by two persons, Mungyaang Ngairaangba and Yumnaam Tonba, and presented the deity to Meitei King Khagemba.

The position of the cult dedicated to God Nongsaba (Nongshaba) was elevated to that of the supreme deity during the reign of Meitei King Khagemba (r. 1597-1652 AD). With the recognition of God Nongsaba as an Umang Lai, a five storied temple building was constructed in his honour.

During the reign of King Khagemba, with the rise of the position of God Nongsaba as a supreme deity, other Umang Lai deities became lesser deities. During the King's reign, a Meitei family named "Leithangbam" was given the duty to look after the cult of God Nongsaba. "Phura", a group of maibis was also established to worship God Nongsaba.

During the reign of Meitei king Paikhomba, there was a spiritual and symbolical marriage ceremony of princess Yaosombi and God Nongsaba, with the offering of an elephant to the deity. From the reign of King Khagemba until the accession of King Charairongba, the cult dedicated to God Nongsaba was more popular than that of God Sanamahi.

During the reign of King Garibniwaz, on the 12th of November 1723, Brahmins (priests of Hinduism) started managing the temples of God Nongsaba (Nongshaba), along with the shrines of other deities, including Yimthei Lai, Panthoibi and Taibangkhaiba (Sanamahi).

With the purge of 1726 AD, the cult of God Nongsaba did not survive for a long time, as his cult was destroyed with the arrival of Hinduism.
On 17 October 1732, King Garibniwaz and his Guru Shantidas Gosai ordered the destruction of temples of God Nongshaba and other deities including Sanamahi, Yumtheilai, Panthoibi, and Umang Lais.

Mythology 
According to the Meitei beliefs, Kangla Sha is a divine representation of Lainingthou Nongshaba.

According to the "Nongshaba Laihui" ("Nongsaba Laihui"), a Meitei text, God Nongsaba (Nongshaba) is the second son of the Universal Lord, and is also known as "Tholbu Chinglen Nongdai Ningthou". According to the text, God Nongsaba is neither assigned much duty nor he has taken a big role in the creation of the universe. Unlike his younger brother Pakhangba, Nongsaba did not stand in the way of his elder brother Asheeba (alias Sanamahi) and abstain himself from disturbing Asheeba in the great task.

Unlike his younger brother Pakhangba, Nongsaba does not have any human descendants. Unlike his elder brother Sanamahi, Nongsaba does not have any manifestation in human forms. These are mentioned in the Meitei scriptures, the Pakhangba Laihui and the Sanamahi Laihui.

The Nongsaba Laihui (Nongshaba Laihui) describes the magnificence of all the glories of God Nongsaba (Nongshaba) as follows:

The "Nongsaba Laihui" text further describes God Nongsaba (Nongshaba) as:

The same text describes all the Umang Lai deities, including Sanamahi, as the attendants of God Nongsaba (Nongshaba).

According to Dr. Saroj Nalini Arambam Parratt, the second stanza of the Meitei poem “Anoirol”, sung in the Lai Haraoba, mentions many sky deities including God Nongshaba. Nongshaba is described as the god of the sky of Moirang.

Worship 
Devotees worship God Nongsaba (Nongshaba) by offering white clothes, fruits, flowers, white fish, preferably "Sareng" and loincloth. Similar offerings can be offered to Pakhangba and Yumjao Lairembi (Yumjao Leima).

In early times, God Nongshaba was venerated, along with Pakhangba, in the "Naoshumshang", the shrine of ancestral figures. The God was prayed for the longevity of the lives of the Meitei kings.

At a place named "Khoibaching" in Manipur, a round shaped stone is worshipped as God Nongshaba. The shrine is reserved for the kings only. It is 6 cubits deep.

According to Meitei culture, the "Phura" is a class of the maibis, who are used to take care of the cult of God Nongshaba.

Representations in Meitei dresses 

In traditional Meitei dress making art and culture, the patterns of the "Ningkham" and the "Samjin" are the representations of God Nongshaba.
The "Samjin" represents the head portion of God Nongshaba. The "Ningkham" represents the tail portion of God Nongshaba.
 Head of Nongshaba 
The head of God Nongshaba is believed to be similar to that of the unicorn, being represented in the headgear ("headwear" or "headdress") by the curved decorated stick raising up at its apex.
 Ears of Nongshaba 
The two ears of God Nongshaba are symbolically represented by the fan like frills on the two sides of the headdress.
 Beard of Nongshaba 
The beard of God Nongshaba is symbolically represented by the long and narrow strip of a decorative cloth hanging loosely on the chest.
 Patterned body of Nongshaba 
The patterned body of God Nongshaba is represented by the wearing of the Khamen Chatpa loincloth around the loin.
 Tail of Nongshaba 
The tail of God Nongshaba is symbolically represented by the "Ningkham" on the girdle.

In Bangladesh 
Meitei kings constructed many temples dedicated to Meitei deities in Bangladesh, among which a shrine dedicated to God Nongshaba was a notable one. In the Manipuri Rajbari in Lama Bazar of Bangladesh, there is a temple of God Nongshaba, built along with the temples of God Pakhangba and Goddess Yumjao Lairembi. Its architecture is similar to that of Goddess Yumjao Lairembi. The Temple's facade faces South. Its ground plan is square in shape, covering an area of 2.40 sq. meters.

Namesakes 
On the 15th of December 2015 in Imphal, a fortnightly magazine named "Nongsaba" was launched under the motto "Journalism for change". The publication focuses on the socio-political, economy, education, unemployment, art and culture, science, sports, beauty, health, entertainment, etc.

Notes

References

Further reading

External links 

 Nongshaba at 
 Nongshaba at 

Abundance gods
Lion deities
Arts gods
Crafts gods
Creator gods
Earth gods
Fortune gods
Health gods
Horned gods
Kings in Meitei mythology
Life-death-rebirth gods
Light gods
Magic gods
Maintenance gods
Meitei dragons
Meitei deities
Mythological kings
Names of God in Sanamahism
Nature gods
Ningthou
Peace gods
Savior gods
Sky and weather gods
Solar gods
Tutelary gods